The 1971-72 Namibian contract workers strike was a dispute involving contract workers across Namibia (then known as South West Africa). It began on 13 December 1971 in Windhoek and Walvis Bay before spreading among miners in Tsumeb and beyond. Approximately 25,000 workers participated in the strike by it's end, mainly those from Ovamboland in the country's densely populated north. 

The public goal of strikers was to end the contract labour system, which many characterized as close to slavery. An underlying goal was the promotion of independence under SWAPO leadership.

Background
In June 1971, the International Court of Justice ruled that South Africa's ongoing occupation of Namibia was illegal, which encouraged anti-colonial actions within the territory. In August, pro-independence students had been expelled from schools throughout Ovamboland by South African officials. Many former students then took contract work with the intention of promoting a general strike.

Course of the strike 
One broad agreement was established on January 20, 1972,"The main provisions of the new system were as follows:(1) The South West Africa Native Labour Association (SWANLA) would be

abolished. In its place, the Owambo government would provide 

labour employment bureaux in the different regions, where work 

seekers would be registered and given employment. (2) A written agreement would be entered into directly between employer 

and employee, and signed-up workers would be given a copy of their

contract (or work agreement) detailing starting salaries, overtime,

bonuses, hours of work, leave conditions, and the duration of the contract. (3) The employee would be able to enter into another contract with the

same employer or another employer at the expiration of a contract 

though this would be subject to the 'exigiencies of registration' (Cape Times January 21, 1972). (4) The revised contract might be terminated by either party, and

breach of contract would no longer be a criminal offence but a

matter for civil action. The employee 'would be entitled to take 

unpaid home leave during his period of service and paid leave

at the expiration of his contract. (5) Arrangements in respect of rations, where provided for a large

number of workers, were also considered in the agreement as well 

as the establishment of a machinery to settle labour disputes."While a significant portion of workers returned after this agreement, the strike did not fully end. Many continued striking, returning only several months later.

Aftermath

See Also

References 

Strike
Strike
1971-72 Skorpion
1971 labor disputes and strikes
1972 labor disputes and strikes
Miners' labor disputes in Africa
Mining in Namibia
General strikes in Africa